Mike Swaim Jr. (born June 16, 1976) is a former NASCAR driver. He made a few starts in the NASCAR Craftsman Truck Series and NASCAR Busch Grand National Series, but found most of his success in the NASCAR Goody's Dash Series, winning 12 races in his career and the 1997 championship driving for Falcon Racing.  He made his first career Busch series start for Innovative Motorsports after Andy Santerre broke his leg in a wreck in the season opening race at Daytona International Speedway.

Motorsports career results

NASCAR
(key) (Bold – Pole position awarded by qualifying time. Italics – Pole position earned by points standings or practice time. * – Most laps led.)

Busch Series

Camping World Truck Series

ARCA Re/Max Series
(key) (Bold – Pole position awarded by qualifying time. Italics – Pole position earned by points standings or practice time. * – Most laps led.)

References

External links
 

Living people
1976 births
NASCAR drivers
Sportspeople from High Point, North Carolina
Racing drivers from North Carolina
ARCA Menards Series drivers